Jeremy Colliton (born January 13, 1985) is a Canadian professional ice hockey coach and former player. He is currently serving as head coach of the Abbotsford Canucks of the American Hockey League (AHL). Colliton is a former head coach of the Chicago Blackhawks of the National Hockey League (NHL). He played in the NHL for the New York Islanders.

Playing career
Colliton was drafted in the second round, 58th overall by the New York Islanders in the 2003 NHL Entry Draft from the Western Hockey League's Prince Albert Raiders.

In his rookie season Colliton played 19 National Hockey League games with the Islanders with one goal and one assist for two points and plus/minus 2 and 6 penalty minutes. With the Bridgeport Sound Tigers, the American Hockey League (AHL) affiliate of the Islanders, he had 21 goals and 32 assists in 66 games in his rookie season. He was also a part of the ADT Canada–Russia Challenge for Team WHL for 2004 and 2005, when he was also the alternate captain.

On June 19, 2009, Colliton signed with Rögle BK of the Swedish Elitserien.

To start the 2010–11 season, Colliton returned to the Islanders organization signing a contract with the Sound Tigers, before on November 30, 2010, signing a one-year, two-way contract with the New York Islanders.

On July 14, 2011, Colliton signed a one-year, two-way contract with the Islanders.

Whilst recovering from injury prior to the lockout-shortened 2012–13 season, Colliton struggled to find a professional club upon recovery and took the majority of the year off. On February 12, 2013, Colliton linked up with a senior ice hockey league team, the Bentley Generals, for the Allan Cup tournament.

On June 1, 2013, Colliton resumed his professional career signing a one-year deal in returning to Sweden with Mora IK of the HockeyAllsvenskan. After only three games with Mora, Colliton was unable to continue playing due to ongoing post-concussion syndrome.

Personal life
Colliton has three children.

International play
Colliton was part of the Canadian under-18 national team, which won gold medal in the 2003 IIHF World U18 Championships. He also played for the Canadian under-20 national team with whom he won silver medal in the 2004 World Junior Ice Hockey Championships and gold medal in 2005 World Junior Ice Hockey Championships.

Coaching career
On January 9, 2014, he announced his retirement from professional hockey and was later chosen as Mora head coach in an interim role mid-season before signing on to be full-time coach.

On May 18, 2017, Colliton was named the head coach of the Rockford IceHogs of the American Hockey League (AHL), the affiliate of the Chicago Blackhawks.

On November 6, 2018, the Blackhawks promoted Colliton to become the 38th head coach in franchise history following the dismissal of Joel Quenneville. At the time of his hiring, Colliton became the youngest active head coach in the NHL. On November 8, in his NHL coaching debut the Blackhawks lost 4–3 to the Carolina Hurricanes.

On November 6, 2021, Colliton was fired  after leading the team to a 1–9–2 start to the 2021–22 season.

On January 30, 2022, Colliton assumed head coaching duties of the Canadian Men's Olympic Team after Claude Julien suffered an injury. He led team Canada to victory in their first game of the tournament defeating Germany 5–1. Julien returned after game one and reassumed his head coaching duties, while Colliton returned to assistant coach.

On July 1, 2022, Colliton was named head coach of the Abbotsford Canucks of the AHL, replacing Trent Cull who received a promotion to assistant coach with the Vancouver Canucks.

Career statistics

Regular season and playoffs

International

Head coaching record

NHL

 Shortened season due to the COVID-19 pandemic during the 2019–20 season. Playoffs were played in August 2020 with a different format.

Other Leagues

References

External links
 

1985 births
Living people
Bridgeport Sound Tigers players
Canadian expatriate ice hockey players in Sweden
Canadian ice hockey centres
Canadian ice hockey coaches
Chicago Blackhawks coaches
Crowsnest Pass Timberwolves players
Ice hockey people from Alberta
Mora IK players
New York Islanders draft picks
New York Islanders players
People from Foothills County
Prince Albert Raiders players
Rögle BK players